is a Japanese actress and voice actress. She started her career as a Japanese idol member of Horipro's HOP Club under the stage name  and is a gravure idol. She started an extensive voice acting career under the stage name  .

Biography
Ichimichi worked with Horipro's idol group HOP Club with the stage name . She appeared in the variety show Enter! 371. After the release of the idol DVD Ike Ike Go! Go! HOP Club, she left the group. After signing with Yellow Cab Next, she became a co-host in the Weekly Shōnen Jump variety show Sakiyomi Jan Bang!. She played Luka Millfy/Gokai Yellow in the Super Sentai series Kaizoku Sentai Gokaiger, following the footsteps of her former HOP Club batch mate Suzuka Morita. She released her first solo gravure idol DVD A Distant Shore, along with a companion photo book of the same title. She promoted her second idol video Apartment and photo book Afternoon Tea in December. She released modeling calendars through Try-X.

Filmography

Live-action

Television

Film

Idol videos

Anime

Television
{| class="wikitable sortable"
! Year
! Title
! Role
! class="unsortable"| Notes
! class="unsortable"| Source
|-
|  || Cooking Idol Ai! Mai! Main! (ja) || Kirakira || part anime, part live-action || 
|-
|  || DD Fist of the North Star || Lin || ||  
|-
|  || Chronicles of the Going Home Club || Azarashi || ||  
|-
|  || Teekyu 2 || Kindergartener, Clerk || || 
|-
|  || Silver Spoon || Chidori Ikeda || || 
|-
|  || Wanna Be the Strongest in the World  || MC || || 
|-
|  || Samurai Flamenco || Mizuki Misawa || || 
|-
|  || Noragami || Yui Ayumu || || 
|-
|  || Z/X Ignition || Fierte || || 
|-
|  || Magical Warfare || Ena Kisaki   || || 
|-
|  || World Conquest Zvezda Plot || Renge Komadori   || || 
|-
|  || Inari, Konkon, Koi Iroha  || Imadegawa, Schoolgirl || || 
|-
|  || Brynhildr in the Darkness || Kazumi Schlierenzauer || || 
|-
|  || Locodol || Tomoko Usami || || 
|-
|  || Sword Art Online II || Girl, Girl student || || 
|-
|  || Magic Kaito 1412 || Aoko Nakamori || || 
|-
|  || Ai Tenchi Muyo! || Nana Saruha || || 
|-
|  || Hi-sCoool! SeHa Girls ||  Dreamcast || || 
|-
|  || Gonna be the Twin-Tail!! || Mikoto Sakuragawa || || 
|-
|  || Death Parade || Mai Takada || || 
|-
| –16 || Durarara!!x2 series || Vorona || || 
|-
|  || World Break: Aria of Curse for a Holy Swordsman || Kyoko Takanashi高梨恭子 || || 
|-
|  || Isuca || Suseri Shimazu || || 
|-
|  || Re-Kan! || Kyōko Esumi || || 
|-
|  || Ultimate Otaku Teacher || Madoka Kuramachi || || 
|-
|  || Triage X || Yoko Komine小峯蓉子 || || 
|-
|  || Chaos Dragon: Sekiryū Sen'eki || Izunイズン || || 
|-
|  || Rampo Kitan: Game of Laplace || Higashi Koji Chiyakoヒガシコウジチヨコ || || 
|-
|  || Castle Town Dandelion || White ginkgo白銀杏 || || 
|-
|  || Wakaba Girl || Mao Kurokawa || || 
|-
|  || Santa Claus:ja:暗闇三太 || Kazuyuki Kanegawa鹿羽一之助 || || 
|-
|  || Jitsu wa Watashi wa || Akane Kōmoto || || 
|-
|  || Overlord || Enri Emmot || || 
|-
|  || School-Live! || Yūri Wakasa || || 
|-
|  || Venus Project Climax || Boss Sho下司麗 || || 
|-
|  || The Idolmaster Cinderella Girls 2nd Season || Fumika Sagisawa || || 
|-
|  || Diabolik Lovers: More Blood || Christinaクリスティーナ || || 
|-
|  || Lance N' Masques || Ryu Yuifa || || 
|-
|  || Young Black Jack || fanファン || || 
|-
|  || Chivalry of a Failed Knight || Renren Tomaru || || 
|-
| –16 || The Asterisk War series || Yosuga Migahara美ヶ原よすが || 2 seasons || 
|-
|  || Onsen Yōsei Hakone-chan || Haruna || || 
|-
|  || Rainy Cocoa || Madamマダム || || 
|-
|  || Aria the Scarlet Ammo AA || Raika Hino || || 
|-
|  || DD Fist of the North Star 2 || Lin || || 
|-
|  || Dance with Devils || Schoolgirl || || 
|-
|  || Is the Order a Rabbit? || A customer客 || || 
|-
|  || Phantasy Star Online 2: The Animation || Aika Suzuki || || 
|-
|  || Rainbow Days || Mori Rina森リナ || || 
|-
|  || Undefeated Bahamut Chronicle || Sonia Remistサニア・レミスト || || 
|-
|  || Space Patrol Luluco || Luluco || || 
|-
|  || Seisen Cerberus || Saraato || || 
|-
|  || Hundred || Claire Harvey || || 
|-
|  || Kuromukuro || Yukina Shirakane || || 
|-
|  || And you thought there is never a girl online? || Kyō Goshōin || || 
|-
|  || Tonkatsu DJ Agetarō || Sonoko Hattori || || 
|-
|  || Taboo Tattoo || Aishaアイーシャ || || 
|-
|  || This Art Club Has a Problem! || Yuka Koeda小枝木由佳 || || 
|-
|  || Alderamin on the Sky || Ikta Solork (child) || || 
|-
|  || Monster Hunter Stories: Ride On || Navirou || || 
|-
|  || Mobile Suit Gundam: Iron-Blooded Orphans Season 2 || Julieta Juris || ||  
|-
|  || Flip Flappers || Papika || || <ref>{{cite web|url=http://www.animenewsnetwork.com/news/2016-03-25/studio-3hz-flip-flappers-october-tv-anime-revealed/.100249|title=Studio 3Hz's Flip Flappers October TV Anime Revealed|publisher=Anime News Network|date=March 25, 2016|access-date=November 22, 2016}}</ref>
|-
|  || Keijo || Sayaka Miyata || || 
|-
|  || Classicaloid || Baranowska || || 
|-
| 2016–19 || The Disastrous Life of Saiki K. || Imu Rifuta || Debuted in 2nd season || 
|-
|  || Blue Exorcist: Kyoto Saga || Mamushi Hojo || || 
|-
| –20 || One Room || Yui Hanasaka花坂結衣 || 3 seasons || 
|-
| –20 || Tsugumomo || Taguri Kanayama || 2 seasons || 
|-
|  || Food Wars! Shokugeki no Souma: The Third Plate || Mea Yanai || ||
|-
|  || Hinako Note || Hinako Sakuragi || || 
|-
|  || Twin Angel Break || Meguru Amatsuki/Angel Rose || || 
|-
|  || Kado: The Right Answer || Saraka Tsukai || || 
|-
|  || Aho-Girl || Akane Eimura || || 
|-
|  || Nana Maru San Batsu || Yuki Kōzuki  || || 
|-
|  || Action Heroine Cheer Fruits || Misaki Shirogane ||  || 
|-
|  || Classroom of the Elite || Airi Sakura || || 
|-
|  || King's Game The Animation || Chiemi Honda || || 
|-
| 2017 || Granblue Fantasy The Animation || Narmaya || Episode 12 ||
|-
|  || Katana Maidens ~ Toji No Miko || Suzuka Konohana || also Mini Toji || 
|-
|  || Slow Start || Shion Kyōzuka ||   || 
|-
| –22 || Teasing Master Takagi-san || Yukari Tenkawa || 3 seasons || 
|-
|  || The Seven Deadly Sins : Revival of the Commandments || Melascula || season 2 Eps. 2-4, 6 - ,  || 
|-
| ||A Certain Magical Index III|| Stephanie Gorgeouspalace || ||
|-
| ||Black Clover|| Fana || || 
|-
|  || Gurazeni || Yuki ||  || 
|-
|  ||Magical Girl Site|| Sayuki Ringa || || 
|-
|  || Last Period || Campanella ||  || 
|-
|  ||Cells at Work!|| Eosinophil || || 
|-
|  || Dropkick on My Devil! || Beth || ||
|-
| –21 ||That Time I Got Reincarnated as a Slime|| Shion || || 
|-
|  ||RErideD: Derrida, who leaps through time|| Mage Bilstein || || 
|-
|  ||Uchi no Maid ga Uzasugiru!|| Midori Ukai || Eps. 6- || 
|-
|  ||Magical Girl Spec-Ops Asuka|| Tamara Volkova || || 
|-
|  ||Mob Psycho 100 II|| Minori Asagiri || || 
|-
|  ||Fruits Basket|| Motoko Minagawa || || 
|-
|  ||Over Drive Girl 1/6|| Subaru Amanohara || || 
|-
|  ||Ultramarine Magmell|| Zero || || 
|-
|  ||Are You Lost?|| Homare Onishima || || 
|-
|  ||Demon Lord, Retry!|| Organ || || 
|-
| –20 ||Fire Force|| Iris || || 
|-
|  ||Wasteful Days of High School Girls|| Hisui "Majo" Kujō || || 
|-
|  ||Senki Zesshō Symphogear XV|| Vanessa || || 
|-
|  ||BEM|| Bela || || 
|-
|  ||Is It Wrong to Try to Pick Up Girls in a Dungeon? II|| Lena Tally || || 
|-
|  ||Hōkago Saikoro Club|| Emilia || || 
|-
|  ||Val × Love|| Röskva || || 
|-
|  ||Babylon|| Hiasa Sekuro || || 
|-
|  ||Kandagawa Jet Girls|| Aqua Manjo || || 
|-
|-
|  || Beastars|| Sally || || 
|-
|  ||Rifle is Beautiful|| Rei Asakura || || 
|-
|  ||Id – Invaded|| Hondomachi || || 
|-
|  ||Pet|| Jin || || 
|-
|  ||Nekopara|| Shigure Minaduki || || 
|-
|  ||Hatena Illusion|| Emma Sakurai || || 
|-
|  ||Interspecies Reviewers|| Meidri || || 
|-
|  ||Magia Record|| Nanaka Tokiwa || Episode 6||
|-
|  ||The 8th Son? Are You Kidding Me?|| Vilma || || 
|-
|  ||Arte|| Katarina || || 
|-
|  ||My Next Life as a Villainess: All Routes Lead to Doom!|| Nicol Ascart (childhood) || || 
|-
|  || Dropkick on My Devil!! Dash || Beth || ||
|-
| –22 ||Princess Connect! Re:Dive|| Pecorine/Eustiana von Astraea || || 
|-
|  ||Monster Girl Doctor|| Lorna Arte || || 
|-
|  ||Warlords of Sigrdrifa|| Azuzu Komagome || || 
|-
|  ||Suppose a Kid from the Last Dungeon Boonies Moved to a Starter Town|| Choline || || 
|-
|  ||Gekidol|| Doll || || 
|-
|  ||WIXOSS Diva(A)Live|| Yuki Azami || || 
|-
|  ||Horimiya|| Remi Ayasaki || || 
|-
|  ||Kiyo in Kyoto: From the Maiko House|| Sumire, Momohana || || 
|-
|  ||Dragon Goes House-Hunting|| Albert || || 
|-
|  ||The Way of the Househusband|| Gin || || 
|-
|  || How a Realist Hero Rebuilt the Kingdom || Roroa Amidonia || || 
|-
|  ||Peach Boy Riverside|| Frau || || 
|-
|  || The Dungeon of Black Company || Ranga || || 
|-
|  ||Irina: The Vampire Cosmonaut|| Lyudmila Halrova || || 
|-
|  ||Platinum End|| Saki Hanakago || || 
|-
|  ||Irodorimidori|| Naru Hakobe || || 
|-
|  ||Life with an Ordinary Guy Who Reincarnated into a Total Fantasy Knockout|| Hinata Tachibana (Female) || || 
|-
|  ||Miss Kuroitsu from the Monster Development Department|| Akashic || || 
|-
|  ||Hairpin Double|| Red/Azumi Shibukawa || || 
|-
|  ||Shenmue|| Joy || || 
|-
|  ||Aharen-san wa Hakarenai|| Mitsuki Ōshiro || || 
|-
|  ||The Executioner and Her Way of Life|| Ashuna || || 
|-
|  ||Birdie Wing: Golf Girls' Story|| Kaoruko Iijima || || 
|-
|  ||Love After World Domination|| Hellko || || 
|-
|  ||In the Heart of Kunoichi Tsubaki|| Konoha || || 
|-
|  || Dropkick on My Devil!!! X || Beth || ||
|-
|  ||Lucifer and the Biscuit Hammer|| Anima || || 
|-
|  ||Hanabi-chan Is Often Late|| Thunder Rai Nihonbashi || || 
|-
|  ||My Master Has No Tail|| Mameda || || 
|-
|  ||Me & Roboco|| Madoka || || 
|-
|  || Beast Tamer || Tina Hollee || Episode 13 ||
|-
|  ||Junji Ito Maniac: Japanese Tales of the Macabre|| Kaoru Yoshikawa || || 
|-
|  ||Ultraman|| Balkyua || Season 3 || 
|-
|  ||Synduality|| Schnee || || 
|-
|}

Film

Video games

Other dubbing

Bibliography
 A Distant Shore (2011, companion book to idol video of the same title)
 Afternoon Tea (2012, companion book to Apartment)
 Tooi Nagisa (2011, photo book)

Discography
 The Idolmaster Cinderella Master 031 – Fumika Sagisawa'' –  Fumika Sasaigawa (M・A・O) – reached number 4 on Oricon charts.
  – Yui Hanasaka (M・A・O) – reached number 98 on Oricon charts.

Drama CDs

References

External links
  
  

 
 Mao Ichimichi profile at Oricon 

1992 births
Living people
Japanese film actresses
Japanese idols
Japanese television actresses
Japanese video game actresses
Japanese voice actresses
Voice actresses from Osaka Prefecture
21st-century Japanese actresses